Anton Stanislavovych Kotlyar (born 7 March 1993) is a Ukrainian amateur footballer who plays as a midfielder.

External links
 
 Profile at the Ukrainian Premier League website
 Profile at football.sport.ua
 Profile at sports.ru
 
 

1993 births
Living people
Sportspeople from Kropyvnytskyi
Ukrainian footballers
Ukraine student international footballers
Association football midfielders
Ukrainian expatriate footballers
Expatriate footballers in Belarus
FC Dynamo Kyiv players
FC Oleksandriya players
FC Stal Kamianske players
FC Naftan Novopolotsk players
NK Veres Rivne players
Ukrainian Cup top scorers
Ukrainian expatriate sportspeople in Belarus
FC Helios Kharkiv players
FC Hirnyk-Sport Horishni Plavni players
FC LNZ Cherkasy players
Ukrainian Premier League players
Ukrainian First League players
Ukrainian Second League players
Belarusian Premier League players